Hindustan Organic Chemicals Limited (HOCL) is an Indian central public sector undertaking based in Mumbai. It was established in 1960 to indigenize manufacture of basic chemicals and to reduce country’s dependence on import of vital organic chemicals. Its products are Phenol, Acetone, Nitrobenzene, Aniline, Nitrotoluenes, Chlorobenzenes & Nitro chlorobenzenes. Basic Organic Chemicals includes Pesticides, Drugs & Pharmaceuticals, Dyes & Dyestuffs, Plastics, Resins & Laminates, Rubber Chemicals, Paints, Textile Auxiliaries & Explosives. The company is under the ownership of Government of India and administrative control of Ministry of Chemicals and Fertilizers.

References

External links
 
 Six companies submit EoIs for Hindustan Organic Chemicals

Chemical companies based in Mumbai
Government-owned companies of India
Chemical companies established in 1960
Ministry of Chemicals and Fertilizers
1960 establishments in Maharashtra
Indian companies established in 1960
Companies listed on the National Stock Exchange of India
Companies listed on the Bombay Stock Exchange